Rebecca Whitbeck Doerge is an American researcher in statistical bioinformatics, known for her research on quantitative traits. Formerly the Trent and Judith Anderson Distinguished Professor of Statistics at Purdue University, she is currently the dean of the Mellon College of Science at Carnegie Mellon University, with joint appointments in the departments of biology and statistics.

Education and career
Doerge was born in Stamford, New York. After graduating in mathematics from the University of Utah in 1986, she earned a master's degree in statistics from Utah in 1988, advised there by Simon Tavaré. She then completed a Ph.D. in statistics from North Carolina State University in 1993. Her dissertation, supervised by Bruce Weir, was Statistical Methods for Locating Quantitative Trait Loci with Molecular Markers.

After postdoctoral research with Gary Churchill at Cornell University, Doerge joined the Purdue University faculty in 1995. She chaired the Department of Statistics there from 2010 to 2015, and was appointed as Anderson Distinguished Professor in 2011. She moved to Carnegie Mellon to become dean in 2016.

Awards and honors
Doerge became a fellow of the American Association for the Advancement of Science and of the American Statistical Association in 2007.

Selected publications

Books
Statistics at the Bench: A Step-by-step Handbook for Biologists (with Martina Bremer, Cold Spring Harbor Laboratory Press, 2010)
Using R at the Bench: Step-by-Step Data Analytics for Biologists (with Martina Bremer, Cold Spring Harbor Laboratory Press, 2015)

Articles

References

External links

Year of birth missing (living people)
Living people
American statisticians
Women statisticians
University of Utah alumni
North Carolina State University alumni
Purdue University faculty
Carnegie Mellon University faculty
Fellows of the American Association for the Advancement of Science
Fellows of the American Statistical Association